The Afternoon of a Torturer is a 2001 Romanian biography film directed by Lucian Pintilie. It recounts an interview with Franț Țandără, a parricide and a torturer in the Communist jails, who openly confesses to the terrible crimes he committed in his youth. Out of the estimated 1,700 Romanians whose mission under the regime was torturing political prisoners, Țandără was the only one who felt a need to confess.

The film has been described as "a story on the banality of evil and the inhumane atrocity of man". It is based on the 1999 book The Road to Damascus: Confession of a former torturer by Doina Jela, the inspiration for the journalist in the movie.

Cast 
 Gheorghe Dinică — Franț Țandără
 Radu Beligan — The professor
 Ioana Ana Macaria — The journalist
 Coca Bloos — Franț's wife

References

External links 

2000s biographical films
Films directed by Lucian Pintilie
Romanian political films